Huuskonen is a Finnish surname. Notable people with the surname include:

Kalevi Huuskonen (1932–1999), Finnish biathlete
Veikko Huuskonen (1910–1973), Finnish boxer

Finnish-language surnames